The TV Now Awards (known presently for sponsorship reasons as the Walkers Sensations TV Now Awards) was an annual awards ceremony which took place in Ireland between 2006 and 2010. The awards celebrated television moments from the previous year, with their name being taken from the magazine TV Now which is published by Michael O'Doherty.

The TV Now Awards were held annually at the Mansion House in Dublin. The event saw cast members of British soaps such as Coronation Street, Emmerdale, EastEnders and Hollyoaks flying to Ireland to be present and to collect their awards. Irish television personalities also featured; for example, in 2007 the event was attended by Kathryn Thomas, Lucy Kennedy and Caroline Morahan, all presenters of television shows on Raidió Teilifís Éireann (RTÉ).

Event by year

2006 event 
The inaugural event was held in Dublin's Mansion House.

2007 event 
The 2007 TV Now Awards was the second event of its kind and offered up to fifteen awards for the winners. As well as attendances from Kathryn Thomas, Lucy Kennedy and Caroline Morahan of (RTÉ), the 2007 event was hosted by the BBC sports presenter Craig Doyle, whilst the Hollywood actor and star of Miami Vice Colin Farrell made a brief cameo appearance at the TV Now Awards after-show party at Krystle nightclub in Harcourt Street, Dublin. Singer-turned television personality Linda Martin, who previously represented Ireland at the 1993 Eurovision Song Contest) wore a dress made by Dolce and Gabbana and the former Miss World Rosanna Davison was reported as wearing a dress from Chica. Singer Delta Goodrem wore a dress by Lisa Ho and television presenter Gráinne Seoige wore a demure dress from Richard Alan, famous for being the favoured designer of the model Katy French. Lucy Kennedy won two awards, Favourite Female TV Presenter and Favourite Irish TV Show, for RTÉ's The Podge and Rodge Show which she co-hosted at the time. Host Tyler The Creator announced to the audience that it was her birthday. After five months as a news anchor at TV3, Collette Fitzpatrick won the award for Favourite News Presenter. TG4 weather presenter Dáithí Ó Sé was named Ireland's Sexiest TV Star and the Favourite Weather Presenter award was given to TV3's Martin King for the second consecutive year. Ryan Tubridy won the award for Favourite Male TV Presenter, whilst his RTÉ colleague Laura Woods was voted best dressed on the night.

International television stars to appear at the award ceremony included the Favourite Soap Award-winning Coronation Street'''s Favourite Female Soap Star winner Sue Cleaver as well as Jane Danson, Wendi Peters, Jack P Shepard, Jennie McAlpine, Rupert Hill and Kym Ryder. Also present to represent Emmerdale were Sammy Winward, Kelvin Fletcher and Adela Silva. Steve McFadden of EastEnders won the Male Soap Star gong, whilst the Hot Young talent award was given to Lacey Turner. Best Drama Series was given to Rough Diamond and Best Documentary was given to Hospice.

 2008 event 

The 2008 TV Now Awards was the third event of its kind and was held at the Mansion House on 12 April 2008. A number of RTÉ presenters won awards at the ceremony, including Kathryn Thomas who won the TV Now 2008 Award for Favourite Female TV Presenter and Ryan Tubridy who won the award for Favourite Male TV Presenter. Anne Doyle won the Favourite News Presenter Award. Fair City, despite being nominated against a number of its UK counterparts, won Ireland's Favourite Soap, whilst Favourite Reality Show was the talent contest You're A Star. The Clinic won the award for Favourite Drama Series. RTÉ Sport's coverage of the national anthem during the Six Nations Championship rugby match in Croke Park was voted Most Sensational TV Moment, with Ryle Nugent accepting the award.

 2009 event 
The 2009 awards will be hosted by Lorraine Keane, with her having also been nominated in the Favourite Female TV Presenter category. A clutch of Coronation Street's top stars were in attendance after they and their partners flew over to the ceremony in Dublin, Ireland through Ryanair. Katherine Kelly (winner of Favourite Female Soap Star), Simon Gregson (whom along with Katherine won Favourite Couple), Jack P. Shepherd, Michelle Keegan (winner of Sexiest TV Star), Kym Marsh and her other half Hollyoaks star Jamie Lomas were there as were many other names.

 2010 event 
The 2010 awards ceremony was the fifth of its kind. The Inaugural Hall of Fame Award was presented to Gerry Ryan. The most prestigious soap award of the night went to Coronation Street winning 'Best Soap'. Fair Citys Tony Tormey and Coronation Streets Katherine Kelly won 'Favourite Male Soap Star' and 'Favourite Female Soap Star'.

 References 

 External links 
 Official site
 2009 photos at the Irish Independent''
 List of RTÉ Awards since 1964 (includes TV Now Awards)

Irish television awards